The Chapeauroux is a  long river in the Lozère and Haute-Loire départements, south-central France. Its source is near Estables, in the Margeride. It flows generally northeast. It is a left tributary of the Allier into which it flows between Saint-Bonnet-de-Montauroux and Saint-Christophe-d'Allier.

Départements and communes along its course
This list is ordered from source to mouth: 
Lozère: Estables, Arzenc-de-Randon, Châteauneuf-de-Randon, Pierrefiche, Saint-Jean-la-Fouillouse, Chastanier, Auroux, Grandrieu, Laval-Atger, Saint-Bonnet-de-Montauroux
Haute-Loire: Saint-Christophe-d'Allier

References

Rivers of France
Rivers of Lozère
Rivers of Haute-Loire
Rivers of Auvergne-Rhône-Alpes
Rivers of Occitania (administrative region)